Hockey at the 1952 Olympics may refer to:

Ice hockey at the 1952 Winter Olympics
Field hockey at the 1952 Summer Olympics